Savoy Hotel 217 (German: Savoy-Hotel 217) is a 1936 German drama film directed by Gustav Ucicky and starring Hans Albers, Brigitte Horney and Alexander Engel. It was shot at the Babelsberg Studios in Potsdam. The film's sets were designed by the art directors Robert Herlth and Walter Röhrig. The costumes were by Herbert Ploberger. It premiered at Berlin's UFA-Palast am Zoo.

Cast

Reception
Writing for The Spectator in 1936, Graham Greene gave the film a positive review, characterizing it as an "agreeably [...] slow, good-humoured murder-story". Praising Engel's acting as particularly vivid, Greene summarized the film, claiming: "melodramatic passions are given a pleasantly realistic setting by a very competent director and a first-class cameraman".

References

Bibliography 
 Bock, Hans-Michael & Bergfelder, Tim. The Concise CineGraph. Encyclopedia of German Cinema. Berghahn Books, 2009.
 Klaus, Ulrich J. Deutsche Tonfilme: Jahrgang 1936. Klaus-Archiv, 1988.

External links 
 

1936 films
1936 crime drama films
German crime drama films
Films of Nazi Germany
1930s German-language films
Films directed by Gustav Ucicky
UFA GmbH films
Films set in hotels
Films set in 1911
Films set in Moscow
German black-and-white films
1930s German films
Films shot at Babelsberg Studios